Elizabeth K. Horst is an American diplomat who served as the United States' Chargé d'affaires ad interim to Estonia from 2018 to 2019.

Early life and education

Elizabeth Horst graduated with a Bachelor of Arts in history and German from the University of Kansas, and with a Master of Arts in modern German history from the University of North Carolina at Chapel Hill. She served as a volunteer for the Peace Corps in Niger.

Career

Horst served as the Deputy Economic Counselor in Kyiv, Ukraine. She led the interagency task forces of the United States' embassy in Ukraine during the annexation of Crimea by Russia and the 2014 Ukrainian revolution.

On July 29, 2018, she replaced James D. Melville Jr. as the United States' Chargé d'affaires ad interim to Estonia. She served until her replacement by Brian R. Roraff on August 2, 2019.

References

21st-century American diplomats
American consuls
Ambassadors of the United States to Estonia
University of Kansas alumni
University of North Carolina at Chapel Hill alumni
Year of birth missing (living people)
Living people